Tsepina Cove (‘Zaliv Tsepina’ \'za-liv 'tse-pi-na\) is the 1 km wide cove indenting for 850 m the east coast of Robert Island in the South Shetland Islands, Antarctica.  It is entered south of Galiche Rock off Somovit Point, and north of Batuliya Point.

The feature is named after the medieval fortress of Tsepina in southern Bulgaria.

Location
Bulgarian mapping in 2009.

Maps
 L.L. Ivanov. Antarctica: Livingston Island and Greenwich, Robert, Snow and Smith Islands. Scale 1:120000 topographic map.  Troyan: Manfred Wörner Foundation, 2009.   (Updated second edition 2010.  )
 Antarctic Digital Database (ADD). Scale 1:250000 topographic map of Antarctica. Scientific Committee on Antarctic Research (SCAR). Since 1993, regularly upgraded and updated.

References
 Tsepina Cove. SCAR Composite Antarctic Gazetteer.
 Bulgarian Antarctic Gazetteer. Antarctic Place-names Commission. (details in Bulgarian, basic data in English)

External links
 Tsepina Cove. Copernix satellite image

Coves of Robert Island
Bulgaria and the Antarctic